St John's College Boat Club (SJCBC) is the rowing club of St John's College, Durham University, England. It was founded in 1910 and is one of the oldest boat clubs in Durham.

History
Rowing began at St John's College in October 1910 when trials were held to select a crew for a IV. In 1911, however, the boat house was built thanks to the help of Revd Watts-Ditchfield who telling commented, "we have not won anything yet but can see improvements." Henry Ganderton played a leading role in developing the Club in the 1910s and 1920s. In the 1930s James Atkinson likewise made a great impression on rowing at St John's, captaining for both SJCBC and the University.

Structure

The club is entirely run by students and attracts most of its members from St John's College – though anyone can join with the permission of the Captain of Boats.

The club has around 80 active members. It is run by an executive committee, elected at the club's annual general meeting in June. These are Captain of Boats, Vice-Captain, Men's Squad Captain, Women's Squad Captain, Head Coxswain, Treasurer, Head Boatman, Social Secretary, Secretary to the Regatta Blue Club, Publicity Officer, and Novice Development Officer. The club's alumni association, the Regatta Blue Club, maintains a strong link between past and present students who meet together for major events.

Competition

The club won the Durham College Rowing Senate Cup and the DCR Women's Novice Cup in 2016, 2017 and the 2018 season. The Club also had wins in Hexham, Durham City, and York Regattas. In the club's novice-training programme, at the 2018 DCR Novice Cup the novice women's boats placed 1st, 2nd and 4th, and the men placing 3rd, making the club overall winners.

The Club competes mainly on the North Eastern regatta circuit, though has entered boats into BUCS, the Head of the River Race (HoRR), Women's Head of the River Race (WeHorr), and the Boston Rowing Marathon.

Club colours
The blades are a dark Regatta blue and boats have Regatta blue and crimson chevrons on their bow-canvasses.

The racing Lycra all-in-one is Navy blue with red and white stripes.

The club blazer is white with Regatta Blue trim. Blazers are awarded to members as a sign of long-term commitment and athletic achievement, and is worn by members at formal and informal social events.

See also
 University rowing in the United Kingdom

References

1910 establishments in England
Durham University Rowing Clubs
Sports clubs established in 1910